Dawkinsia assimilis is a species of ray-finned fish in the genus Dawkinsia. It is endemic to the southern Western Ghats especially to the Southwest Indian states of Karnataka and Kerala. They are known as Mascara Barb.
Filament barbs are a group of small freshwater fishes found in the rivers of peninsular India and Sri Lanka. There are nine species known under the genus Dawkinsia. These barbs are popular among aquarium hobbyists as an ornamental fish and are also collected from rivers and bred for trade.

Distribution
The precise extent of its distribution remains unclear. It has been collected from the Netravati, Chalakudy and Kallada river basins in recent years.

Description

Adults measure up to 4.33 cm. It differs from all other South Asian Puntius. It is a barb with a black band about as wide as eye across each caudal-fin lobe.

References

External links

Dawkinsia
Endemic fauna of the Western Ghats
Freshwater fish of India
Taxa named by Thomas C. Jerdon
Fish described in 1849